Rodions Kurucs (born 5 February 1998) is a Latvian professional basketball player for SIG Strasbourg of the French LNB Pro A. At  tall, he plays the small forward position.

Professional career

Early career
In March 2014, Kurucs signed a multi-year contract with the Latvian club VEF Rīga, after having played for the club's youth academy, VEF Rīga Skola, in Latvia's second men's division (LBL2). He made his debut on VEF's first team, during the 2014–15 campaign, logging his first minutes in Latvia's top-tier level league, the LBL, in the Eastern European regional VTB United League, and in Europe's second-tier level league, the EuroCup. He played at the Adidas Next Generation Tournament in 2015.

FC Barcelona
In July 2015, Kurucs agreed to a four-year deal with the Spanish powerhouse FC Barcelona. He then spent the 2015–16 season playing in the junior club of FC Barcelona. In 2016, after turning 18 years of age, Kurucs joined the reserve team of FC Barcelona, FC Barcelona B, of the LEB Oro, which is the second-tier level in the Spanish league system.

Kurucs made his debut in the European-wide top-tier level EuroLeague, on 24 March 2017, in a 67–54 home win against Crvena zvezda Belgrade. In his first EuroLeague game, he logged three minutes of playing time, and scored two points. On 13 July 2018, Kurucs parted ways with FC Barcelona, but the Catalan club reserved the player's rights in case he returned to play in Europe.

NBA draft rights
Kurucs entered his name into the 2017 NBA draft, being one of a record-high 182 underclassmen to do so that year. Despite being consistently considered a first round draft pick throughout most mock drafts, Kurucs ultimately withdrew his name from the draft, on 12 June 2017; the deadline date that international players had decide to whether or not to withdraw their names from the draft. Kurucs entered his name for the 2018 NBA draft on 21 April 2018 as one of 236 underclassed prospects willing to enter the draft.

Brooklyn Nets (2018–2021)
On 21 June 2018, Kurucs was selected by the Brooklyn Nets in the second round (40th overall). On 16 July 2018, Kurucs signed a multi-year contract with the Nets. Kurucs made his NBA debut on 17 October and scored three points in 103–100 season-opening loss to the Detroit Pistons. On 21 December, Kurucs scored a career-high 24 points in the Nets' 114–106 loss to the Indiana Pacers. On 23 December, Kurucs recorded his first career double-double with 16 points and 10 rebounds in a 111–103 win over the Phoenix Suns. On 26 December, he had 13 points and a career-high 12 rebounds in a 134–132 double overtime win over the Charlotte Hornets. On 7 January 2019, he repeated his career high 24 points in a 116–95 loss to the Boston Celtics. On 29 January, Kurucs was named a participant of the 2019 Rising Stars Challenge as a member of the World Team.

Houston Rockets (2021)
On 14 January 2021, Kurucs was traded to the Houston Rockets in a multi-player, three-team deal with the Cleveland Cavaliers that sent James Harden to Brooklyn Nets.

Milwaukee Bucks (2021)
On 19 March 2021, Kurucs was traded to the Milwaukee Bucks along with P. J. Tucker for D. J. Augustin, D. J. Wilson, and the right to swap draft picks in the 2021 NBA Draft. On 12 May, he was waived by the Bucks after making five appearances.

Partizan (2021–2022)
On 7 July 2021, Kurucs signed with KK Partizan of the Basketball League of Serbia and the ABA League. 

In May 2022, after not appearing in any games since early March, Kurucs parted ways with Partizan as the club allowed him to continue training individually in Latvia due to not featuring in coach Željko Obradović's plans.

Kurucs joined the Toronto Raptors for the 2022 NBA Summer League.

Real Betis (2022)
On August 23, 2022, he signed with Real Betis of the Liga ACB.

SIG Strasbourg (2022–present)
On December 19, 2022, he signed with SIG Strasbourg of the French LNB Pro A.

National team career
Kurucs played for the Latvian national under-16 team at the 2014 Baltic Sea Cup, and at the 2014 FIBA Europe Under-16 Championship. He played a crucial role in helping Latvia win the silver medal at the tournament, as he averaged 13.4 points, 5.9 rebounds, 1.9 assists, 1.4 steals, and 1.1 blocked shots per game, en route to earning a spot on the All-Tournament Team, and being selected to the Eurobasket.com's website All-European Championship Under-16 First Team.

Career statistics

Regular season

|-
| style="text-align:left;"|
| style="text-align:left;"|Brooklyn
| 63 || 46 || 20.5 || .450 || .315 || .783 || 3.9 || .8 || .7 || .4 || 8.5
|-
| style="text-align:left;"|
| style="text-align:left;"|Brooklyn
| 47 || 9 || 14.6 || .446 || .367 || .632 || 2.9 || 1.1 || .5 || .1 || 4.6
|-
| style="text-align:left;"|
| style="text-align:left;"|Brooklyn
| 5 || 0 || 3.2 || .333 || .500 ||  || .6 || .4 || .0 || .0 || .6
|-
| style="text-align:left;"|
| style="text-align:left;"|Houston
| 11 || 0 || 6.8 || .238 || .133 || .500 || 1.0 || .4 || .5 || .4 || 1.2
|-
| style="text-align:left;"|
| style="text-align:left;"|Milwaukee
| 5 || 0 || 6.8 || .625 || .750 || 1.000 || 1.8 || .8 || .6 || .0 || 3.0
|- class="sortbottom"
| style="text-align:center;" colspan="2"|Career
| 131 || 55 || 16.1 || .444 || .329 || .739 || 3.1 || .9 || .6 || .3 || 6.0

Playoffs

|-
| style="text-align:left;"|2019
| style="text-align:left;"|Brooklyn
| 4 || 3 || 17.0 || .400 || .250 || .778 || 5.0 || .8 || .5 || .0 || 6.3
|-
| style="text-align:left;"|2020
| style="text-align:left;"|Brooklyn
| 4 || 1 || 14.5 || .550 || .000 || .000 || 3.3 || .8 || .3 || .5 || 5.5
|- class="sortbottom"
| style="text-align:center;" colspan="2"|Career
| 8 || 4 || 15.8 || .475 || .125 || .636 || 4.1 || .8 || .4 || .3 || 5.9

Personal life
Kurucs' brother Artūrs is also playing competitive basketball.

References

External links

 Rodions Kurucs at acb.com 
 Rodions Kurucs at eurobasket.com
 Rodions Kurucs at euroleague.net
 Rodions Kurucs at draftexpress.com
 Rodions Kurucs at fiba.com (archive)
 Rodions Kurucs at fibaeurope.com

1998 births
Living people
ABA League players
BK VEF Rīga players
Brooklyn Nets draft picks
Brooklyn Nets players
FC Barcelona Bàsquet players
Houston Rockets players
KK Partizan players
Latvian expatriate basketball people in Serbia
Latvian expatriate basketball people in Spain
Latvian expatriate basketball people in the United States
Latvian men's basketball players
Liga ACB players
Long Island Nets players
Milwaukee Bucks players
National Basketball Association players from Latvia
People from Cēsis
Real Betis Baloncesto players
Small forwards